Straight Between the Eyes is the sixth studio album by the British hard rock band Rainbow, released in 1982. A remastered CD reissue, with packaging duplicating the original vinyl release, was released in May 1999.

History
The band line-up was the same as had recorded the previous year's Difficult to Cure album, with the exception of David Rosenthal, who replaced Don Airey on keyboards.

The title allegedly came from a phrase from Jeff Beck, describing Jimi Hendrix to Blackmore.

The sleeve-art is by British artist Jeff Cummins and Hipgnosis. The original vinyl issue had the lyrics printed on the inner sleeve.

In an April 1982 interview with British rock magazine Kerrang!, Blackmore stated of "MISS Mistreated", "Well it's to avoid confusion that the 'Miss' is written three times bigger than the 'mistreated' but I expect we'll have someone who shall remain nameless coming up to us saying 'I wrote that song'!" That someone being David Coverdale, with whom Blackmore had co-written "Mistreated" for the 1974 Deep Purple album Burn. Blackmore had this issue with Coverdale previously when a rendition of "Mistreated" was included on the Rainbow live album On Stage.

Videos were shot for the songs "Stone Cold" and "Death Alley Driver", which featured Sega's video game Turbo. They were occasionally still aired on VH1's Metal Mania program, but have not been aired since 2005. However, they can be found on YouTube or on the band's "Final Cut" 1985 home video.

Tour
The tour featured a giant pair of moving mechanical eyes as part of the stageset, with spotlights shining from the pupils. This is captured on the video release Live Between the Eyes recorded at the Hemisfair Arena in San Antonio, Texas on August 18, 1982. The tour, although extensive, did not include the UK, which rankled with British fans.

Accolades
In 2022, Straight Between the Eyes was named #5 of 'The 25 greatest rock guitar albums of 1982' list in Guitar World.

Track listing

Personnel
Rainbow
Ritchie Blackmore - guitar 
Roger Glover - bass, producer
Joe Lynn Turner - vocals
Bobby Rondinelli - drums
David Rosenthal - keyboards, orchestral arrangements

Additional musicians
François Dompierre - orchestra conductor
Raymond Dessaint - orchestra lead

Production
Engineered by Nick Blagona (assisted by Robbie Whelan)
Recorded at Le Studio, Morin Heights, Canada
Digital mixing by Roger Glover and Nick Blagona
Digital mastering by Greg Calbi, Sterling Sound, New York

Charts 
 

Album

Singles

Certifications

In other media
The song "Stone Cold" was featured in the video game Grand Theft Auto: Vice City Stories on the radio station Emotion 98.3.

References

1982 albums
Rainbow (rock band) albums
Albums with cover art by Hipgnosis
Albums produced by Roger Glover
Albums recorded at Le Studio
Polydor Records albums
Mercury Records albums